Meghann Shaughnessy was the defending champion, but chose not to participate that year.

Maria Kirilenko won in the final 6–0, 6–2, against María José Martínez Sánchez.

Seeds

Draw

Finals

Top half

Bottom half

External links
Draw and Qualifying Draw

Singles